Events from the year 1719 in Ireland.

Incumbent
Monarch: George I

Events 
November 2 – the Toleration Act ("For exempting the Protestant Dissenters of this kingdom from certain penalties to which they are now subject"), passed by the Parliament of Ireland, receives Royal Assent.
March 26 Old Style (1720 New Style) – the Dependency of Ireland on Great Britain Act 1719 is passed by the Parliament of Great Britain.
First service held in the rebuilt St. Werburgh's Church, Dublin (Church of Ireland), designed by Colonel Thomas Burgh, M.P., Surveyor General of Ireland.
Cornelius Nary publishes a new Roman Catholic New Testament Bible translation into English, probably in Dublin.

Births
August 18 – Bernard Ward, 1st Viscount Bangor, politician (d. 1781)
November 23 – Spranger Barry, actor (d. 1777)
James Freney, highwayman (d. 1788)
Godfrey Lill, lawyer and politician (d. 1783)
Thomas Sheridan, actor and elocutionist (d. 1788)

Deaths
March 18 – Élie Bouhéreau, scholar-librarian (b. 1643)
December 24 – William O'Brien, 3rd Earl of Inchiquin, governor (b. 1662)
Henry Colley, politician (b. 1648)
Richard Pockrich, landowner, military commander and politician (b. c.1666)

References

 
Years of the 18th century in Ireland
Ireland
1710s in Ireland